Jokahri is a village in Barhara block of Bhojpur district in Bihar, India. As of 2011, its population was 1,362, in 260 households.

Notable People
Pawan Singh, Popular bhojpuri actor & singer.

References 

Villages in Bhojpur district, India